{{Infobox alpine ski racer
|name           = Matthias Mayer
|image          = Matthias Mayer January 2014.jpg
|image_size     = 210
|caption        = Mayer in January 2014
|disciplines    = Downhill, Super-G,Combined, Giant slalom
|club           = SC Gerlitzen – Kärnten
|birth_date     = 
|birth_place    = Afritz am See, Carinthia, Austria
|death_date     = 
|death_place    = 
|height         = 1.79 m
|wcdebut        = 22 February 2009 (age 18)
|retired        = 29 December 2022 (age 32)
|website        = 
|wcseasons      = 13 – (2011–2023)
|wcwins         = 11 – (7 DH, 3 SG, 1 AC)
|wcpodiums      = 45 – (22 DH, 22 SG, 1 AC)
|wcoveralls     = 0 – (4th in 2020 and 2022)
|wctitles       = 0 – (2nd in DH, 2021)
|olympicteams   = 3 – (2014, 2018, 2022)
|olympicmedals  = 4
|olympicgolds   = 3
|worldsteams    = 5 – (2013–2021)
|worldsmedals   = 0
|worldsgolds    =
| show-medals   = yes
| medaltemplates = 

  

}}
 Matthias Mayer (born 9 June 1990) is an Austrian retired World Cup alpine ski racer and 

Career
Born in Afritz am See in Carinthia, Mayer made his World Cup debut in Sestriere in February 2009. His best discipline is super-G. After several top ten finishes, his first World Cup podium came at Kitzbühel in a super-G in January 2013.

At the 2014 Winter Olympics in Sochi, Russia, Mayer won the downhill to become the seventh Austrian gold medalist in the 18th edition of the event. Joining him on the podium at Rosa Khutor were Christof Innerhofer of Italy and Kjetil Jansrud of Norway. Immediately after the Olympics, he had two podium finishes in Norway, and a victory at the World Cup finals. He won his second Olympic gold medal in 2018 in the super G.

At the 2022 Winter Olympics, Mayer won the bronze medal in the downhill and successfully defended his title in the super G. With three Olympic titles in addition to a bronze, he is Austria’s most decorated Olympic alpine medalist.

On 29 December 2022, Mayer shocked the ski racing community when he announced his immediate retirement at 32 years old, just hours before a super-G race in Bormio he was scheduled to start. He finished his World Cup career with 11 wins and 45 podium finishes in 13 seasons.

Personal life
Mayer's father is Helmut Mayer (b.1966), the silver medalist in the first Olympic super-G in 1988; he also won a silver medal at the World Championships in 1989, in the giant slalom 

 World cup results 
Season standings

Race victories
 11 wins – (7 DH, 3 SG, 1 AC)  
 45 podiums – (22 DH, 22 SG, 1 AC)

World Championship results

Olympic results

References

External links

Austrian Ski team – official site – Matthias Mayer – Head Skis – Matthias Mayer
 – ''

1990 births
Austrian male alpine skiers
Alpine skiers at the 2014 Winter Olympics
Alpine skiers at the 2018 Winter Olympics
Alpine skiers at the 2022 Winter Olympics
Olympic alpine skiers of Austria
Medalists at the 2014 Winter Olympics
Medalists at the 2018 Winter Olympics
Medalists at the 2022 Winter Olympics
Olympic medalists in alpine skiing
Olympic gold medalists for Austria
Olympic bronze medalists for Austria
People from Sankt Veit an der Glan
Living people
Sportspeople from Carinthia (state)
21st-century Austrian people